The Yam languages, also known as the Morehead River languages, are a family of Papuan languages. They include many of the languages south and west of the Fly River in Papua New Guinea and Indonesian West Papua.

Name
The name Morehead and Upper Maro River refers to the area around the Morehead and Maro rivers. Most of the languages are found between these rivers, but the Nambu subgroup are spoken east of the Morehead.  Evans (2012) refers to the family instead with the more compact name Yam. This name is motivated by a number of linguistic and cultural items of significance:  yam (and cognates) means "custom, tradition"; yəm (and cognates) means "is"; and yam tubers are the local staple and of central cultural importance.

External relationships
Ross (2005) tentatively includes the Yam languages in the proposed Trans-Fly – Bulaka River family. More recently (Evans 2012) has argued that this is not justified and more data has to be gathered. Evans (2018) classifies the Pahoturi River languages as an independent language family.

Yam languages have also been in intensive contact with Marind and Suki speakers, who had historically expanded into Yam-speaking territories via headhunting raids and other expansionary migrations.

Classification
Internal classification of the Yam languages:
Yei
Tonda languages (a dialect chain) 
Nambu languages (a dialect chain)

Wichmann (2013) did not find a connection between the branches in his automated comparison.

Languages
Yam languages are spoken by up to 3,000 people on both sides of the border in Papua New Guinea and Indonesia. In Papua New Guinea, Yam languages are spoken in Morehead Rural LLG, Western Province. In Papua, Indonesia, Yam languages are spoken in Merauke Regency.

Yam languages and respective demographic information listed by Evans (2018) are provided below. Geographical coordinates are also provided for some villages.

{| class="wikitable sortable"
|+ List of Yam languages
! Language !! Alternative names !! Subgroup !! Speakers !! Villages or hamlets
|-
| Anta || Tokwe, Upper Morehead, Thamnga || Tonda || 150 || Ufarua, Forzitho, Thamgakar in central Morehead Rural LLG, PNG
|-
| Komnzo || Kamundjo, Upper Morehead, (Mema, Ranzér), Zókwasi, Farem || Tonda || 200 || Rouku, Gunana, Morehead, Firra, Masu, Kanathér in central Morehead Rural LLG, PNG
|-
| Wára || Tjokwe, Upper Morehead, Wära, Mät || Tonda || 350 || Yokwa, (Mäwsa, Kwaikér, Zäzér Ménz) in central Morehead Rural LLG, PNG
|-
| Wérè || Tokwe, Upper Morehead, Wórä || Tonda || 100 || Tokwa, Kanfok in central Morehead Rural LLG, PNG
|-
| Kémä || Upper Morehead || Tonda || 130 || Wämnefér in central Morehead Rural LLG, PNG
|-
| Kánchá || Kunja, Lower Morehead, Peremka, Kénzä || Tonda || 350* || Bondobol, Bula, Jarai in southeast Morehead Rural LLG, PNG
|-
| Ránmo || Tonda, Renmo, Blafe || Tonda || 200* || Yéndorodoro, Mengete in west Morehead Rural LLG, PNG
|-
| Mblafe || Blafe, Blafe Wonana, Tonda || Tonda || 350* || Weam, Kandarisa, Wereaver (only recently in Wereaver) in west Morehead Rural LLG, PNG
|-
| Warta Thuntai || Guntai, Kan || Tonda || 430 || Wando, Bensbach, Balamuk, Korombo 1, Korombo 2 in mid southwest Morehead Rural LLG, PNG
|-
| Arammba || None || Tonda || 750 || Fwasam, Gowi, Kiriwa, Meru, Sedefi, Serki in north central Morehead Rural LLG, PNG
|-
| Nggarna || Ngar, Kanum, Sota || Tonda || unknown || Vicinity of Sota in west Morehead Rural LLG, PNG
|-
| Rema ||  || Tonda || 10? (moribund or extinct) || Wereaver in west Morehead Rural LLG, PNG
|-
| Smerki || Smärki, Kanum, Barkari || Tonda || 150 || Rawu Biru, Tomer, Tomerau, Yakiw in southeast Merauke Regency, Indonesia
|-
| Tamer || Smerki, Smärki, Kanum || Tonda || 120 || Yanggandur (recently moved there) in southeast Merauke Regency, Indonesia
|-
| Ngkontar || Ngkontar, Ngkolmpu || Tonda || 100 || Yanggandur in southeast Merauke Regency, Indonesia and into PNG
|-
| Ngkolmpu || Kiki, Ngkntra Kiki, Kanum, Enkelembu, Kenume, Knwne || Tonda ||  || east Merauke Regency, Indonesia and into PNG
|-
| Bedi Ngkolmpu || Kanum, Enkelembu, Kenume, Knwne || Tonda || 5 (moribund or extinct) || Onggaya in south central Merauke Regency, Indonesia
|-
| Yei ||  || Yei || 1278 || Po, Torai, Bupul, Tanas, Kwel in east Merauke Regency, Indonesia
|-
| Nen ||  || Nambu || 350 || Bimadeben in central Morehead Rural LLG, PNG
|-
| Nama ||  || Nambu || 1200 || Daraia, Mata, Ngaraita in central Morehead Rural LLG, PNG
|-
| Namat || Mibini || Nambu || 170* || Mibini in central Morehead Rural LLG, PNG
|-
| Nambo || Nmbo, Keraki; Namna, Yarne || Nambu || 710 || Nambo variety: Gubam, Bebdeben, Arufi in central Morehead Rural LLG, PNG; Namna variety: Pongarki, Derideri in central Morehead Rural LLG, PNG
|-
| Neme ||  || Nambu || 200 || Keru, Mitere in central Morehead Rural LLG, PNG
|-
| Dre || Ndre || Nambu || 1 || Ramar in central Morehead Rural LLG, PNG
|-
| Namo || Nä || Nambu || 374* || Tais, Mari in south Morehead Rural LLG, PNG
|-
| Len || Lä || Nambu || 8–10 || Now living in Tais, original village was Yaoga in south Morehead Rural LLG, PNG
|}

See also: Districts of Papua (Indonesian Wikipedia)

Pronouns
The pronouns Ross (2005) reconstructs for the family are,

Proto-Yam (Proto–Morehead – Upper Maro)
{| class=wikitable
|-
| I/we||*ni
|-
| you||*bu
|-
| s/he/they||*be
|}

Typology
Many Yam languages display vowel harmony, including in Nambu and Tonda languages.

Vocabulary comparison

Basic vocabulary
The following basic vocabulary words are from McElhanon & Voorhoeve (1970) and Voorhoeve (1975), as cited in the Trans-New Guinea database:

{| class="wikitable sortable"
! gloss !! Kanum !! Yei
|-
! head
| mel || kilpel
|-
! hair
| mel-kata || peab
|-
! eye
| si || cur
|-
! tooth
| tor || ter
|-
! leg
| tegu || cere
|-
! louse
| neːmpin || nim
|-
! dog
| krar || jeu
|-
! pig
| kwer || becek
|-
! bird
| sento || yarmaker
|-
! egg
| bel || mekur
|-
! blood
| mbel || gul
|-
! bone
| mbaːr || gor
|-
! skin
| keikei || paːr
|-
! tree
| per || per
|-
! man
| ire || el-lu
|-
! sun
| koŋko || mir
|-
! water
| ataka || kao
|-
! fire
| mens || benj
|-
! stone
| melle || mejer
|-
! name
| iu || ore
|-
! eat
| anaŋ || cenye
|-
! one
| namper || nampei
|-
! two
| yempoka || yetapae
|}

Fauna names
Below are some turtle names in Yam languages, along with names in Suki:

{| class="wikitable sortable"
! Turtle species !! Arammba (Serki) !! Neme (Keru) !! Nama Wat (Daraia) !! Nama Was (Mibini) !! Guntai (Wando) !! Blafe (Wereave) !! Rema (Metafa) !! Suki (Suki, Puka-duka)
|-
| Elseya branderhorsti || M’bay || Fisor || Fisor Fifi || Rawk Rawk Sutafnarr || Chelba || Nthelon || Forr || Medepka
|-
| Elseya novaeguineae ||  || Fisor ||  ||  ||  ||  ||  || 
|-
| Emydura subglobosa || Maro Kani || Ngani Fisor || Mani Fisor || Mare Sutafnarr || Mare Chelba || Ntharase; Mari Nthelon || Mari Forr || Tegma; i Anki Kan
|-
| Chelodina parkeri || Kunkakta ||  ||  ||  ||  ||  ||  || Kunkakta
|-
| Chelodina rugosa ||  || Tomba Kofe Fisor || Mbuirr || Weya Sutafnarr || Mbroyer || Fisuwar || Tanfer Marr Forr || 
|-
| Chelodina novaeguineae || Fasar Kani ||  || Mboro arr || Mbro arr ||  ||  ||  || Magipinini
|-
| Carettochelys insculpta || Budu Susa ||  || Garr ||  ||  ||  ||  || Budu Susa
|-
| Pelochelys bibroni || Sokrere ||  ||  ||  ||  ||  ||  || Kiye Eise
|-
| Emydura sp. aff. worrelli ||  ||  ||  ||  ||  ||  ||  || Riskap Kani
|}

All species are consumed by humans except for Chelodina novaeguineae, which is avoided due to its pungent odor.
Carettochelys insculpta and Elseya branderhorsti are prized for their large sizes, with E. branderhorsti particularly valued for its plastron.

Further reading
Carroll, Matthew J., Nicholas Evans, I Wayan Arka, Christian Döhler, Eri Kashima, Volker Gast, Tina Gregor, Julia Miller, Emil Mittag, Bruno Olsson, Dineke Schokkin, Jeff Siegel, Charlotte van Tongeren & Kyla Quinn. 2016. Yamfinder: Southern New Guinea Lexical Database.
Döhler, Christian (2018) A grammar of Komnzo. (Studies in Diversity Linguistics 22). Berlin: Language Science Press.  . . Accessed on 2019-11-12. 
Evans, Nicholas, I Wayan Arka, Matthew Carroll, Christian Döhler, Eri Kashima, Emil Mittag, Kyla Quinn, Jeff Siegel, Philip Tama & Charlotte van Tongeren. 2017. The languages of Southern New Guinea. In Bill Palmer (ed.), The languages and linguistics of the New Guinea area, 641–774. Berlin; Boston: Walter de Gruyter. . Accessed on 2019-11-12.
Kaiping, Gereon A. & Edwards, Owen & Klamer, Marian (eds.). 2019. LexiRumah 2.2.3. Leiden: Leiden University Centre for Linguistics. Available online at https://lexirumah.model-ling.eu/lexirumah/. Accessed on 2019-09-14.
Greenhill et al., 2008. In: Kaiping, Gereon A. & Edwards, Owen & Klamer, Marian (eds.). 2019. LexiRumah 2.2.3. Leiden: Leiden University Centre for Linguistics. Available online at https://lexirumah.model-ling.eu/lexirumah/. Accessed on 2019-09-14.

References

External links
Yamfinder
Morehead languages documentation project (DOBES)
 Timothy Usher, New Guinea World, East Morehead River (under construction 2020)
 (ibid.) West Morehead River (under construction 2020)

 
Language families
Papuan languages
Languages of Western Province (Papua New Guinea)